The Catholic University of Central Africa (Université Catholique de l'Afrique Centrale) (CUAC or UCAC) is a private Roman Catholic university in Yaoundé, Cameroon.

History
CUAC was founded in 1989 by the Association of the Episcopal Conference of the Central African Region. It opened in 1991 with 111 students. The university has three campuses around Yaoundé, two in the center of town with the main campus outside of the city. In 2003, Citigroup donated US$20,000 to CUAC, which funded 10 scholarships.

Faculties
CUAC has five faculties:
 Faculty of Theology 
 Faculty of Philosophy 
 Faculty of Social Sciences and Management 
 The Canon Law Department 
 The Advanced School of Nursing
 School of engineering and technology
 School of health sciences

References

Universities in Cameroon
Educational institutions established in 1989
Schools in Yaoundé
Catholic Church in Cameroon
1989 establishments in Cameroon